The 2018–19 Georgia State Panthers women's basketball team represented Georgia State University in the 2018–19 NCAA Division I women's basketball season. The Panthers, led by first year head coach Gene Hill, were a member of the Sun Belt Conference and played their home games on campus at the GSU Sports Arena. They finished season 17–14, 11–7 in Sun Belt play to finish in fourth place. They lost in the quarterfinals of the Sun Belt women's tournament to Appalachian State. They received an invitation to the WBI where they lost to North Alabama in the first round.

Roster

Schedule

|-
!colspan=9 style=| Exhibition

|-
!colspan=9 style=| Non-conference regular season

|-
!colspan=9 style=| Sun Belt regular season

|-
!colspan=9 style=| Sun Belt Women's Tournament

|-
!colspan=9 style=| WBI

See also
 2018–19 Georgia State Panthers men's basketball team

References

Georgia State
Georgia State Panthers women's basketball seasons
Georgia State